The Dr. James J. Bothwell House, also known as Bothwell-Embry House, is a historic residence in Ashville, Alabama.  The house was built in 1835 for James Bothwell, the second doctor in Ashville, and also a clerk of the circuit court.  It is a two-story Federal-style house, with a two-story pedimented portico supported by four Doric columns.  In 1852 a wing was added to the rear of the house for a kitchen and dining room on the ground floor and a bedroom above.  Another ground floor bedroom wing was added in 1882.  Another bedroom was added above in 1917, and the area between the wings was enclosed.  The house was listed on the Alabama Register of Landmarks and Heritage in 1979 and the National Register of Historic Places in 1982.  It is to be sold at auction in May 2014.

References

National Register of Historic Places in St. Clair County, Alabama
Federal architecture in Alabama
Houses completed in 1835
Houses in St. Clair County, Alabama
Properties on the Alabama Register of Landmarks and Heritage